Vakhtang Machavariani (Matchavariani) (Georgian: ვახტანგ მაჭავარიანი) is a Georgian, Russian and Soviet composer and conductor. He is the son of composer Aleksi Matschawariani.

Throughout his career, Vakhtang Machavariani conducted about 80 orchestras, among them the most prominent symphony orchestras of the world.

In 1990 he created the Soviet Festival Orchestra (later the Moscow Festival Orchestra). Since 1996 Vakhtang Machavariani is GMD and Principal Conductor of the Georgian State Symphony Orchestra in Tbilisi, Georgia. In 2003 Vakhtang Machavariani became a GMD of the Russian Bolshoi Symphony Orchestra Millenium. Since 2011 Vakhtang Machavariani performs regularly with the Presidential Symphony Orchestra of Turkey. In the 2013-2014 season Vakhtang Machavariani performs with the Big Symphony Orchestra in Moscow and conducts the Presidential Symphony Orchestra of Turkey in Ankara. Vakhtang Matchavariani is a principal guest conductor of Tbilisi State Opera.

References

Living people
Composers from Georgia (country)
Russian composers
Russian male composers
Year of birth missing (living people)